RNA, ribosomal 2, also known as RNR2, is a human gene coding for ribosomal RNA. Genes for ribosomal RNA are clustered on the short arms of chromosomes 13 (RNR1), 14 (RNR2), 15 (RNR3), 20 (RNR4), 21 (RNR5). The gene for RNR2 exists in multiple copies on chromosome 14.  Each gene cluster contains 30–40 copies and encodes a 45S RNA product that is then processed to form 18S, 5.8S and 28S rRNA.

References

Further reading
 Nucleolus organizer regions are chromosomal regions crucial for the formation of the nucleolus, located on the short arms of the acrocentric chromosomes 13, 14, 15, 21 and 22

Non-coding RNA
RNA
Ribosomal RNA
Ribozymes